Straight Outta Compton: Music from the Motion Picture is the soundtrack to the 2015 film of the same name. The album was released by Universal Music Enterprises on January 8, 2016 in digital formats. The soundtrack features songs that were mainly performed by N.W.A but also includes solo performances from N.W.A members Ice Cube, Eazy-E, and Dr. Dre (featuring Snoop Dogg).

Commercial performance
The soundtrack debuted at number 39 on the US Billboard 200, for the week ending January 30, 2016. The album debuted at number-one on the Top Rap Albums chart. In the second week, the album peaked at number one on the Billboard Top R&B/Hip-Hop Albums, selling 12,000 units in the second chart week.

Track listing
Writing credits adapted from the album's liner notes and those of the albums Eazy-Duz-It and Straight Outta Compton and the EP 100 Miles and Runnin' all of which feature tracks that appear on this album.

Sample credits
"We Want Eazy" samples "Ahh...the Name is Bootsy, Baby" by Bootsy's Rubber Band (written by George Clinton, Bootsy Collins, and Maceo Parker).
"Gangsta Gangsta" samples "Funky Worm" by the Ohio Players (written by Leroy "Sugarfoot" Bonner, Marshall Jones, Ralph Middlebrooks, Norman "Bruce" Napier, Walter Morrison, Andrew Noland, Marvin Pierce, and Greg Webster), "Weak at the Knees" by Steve Arrington' Hall of Fame (written by Arrington, Charles Carter, Wayne "Buddy" Hankerson, and Roger Parker), and "Be Thankful for What You Got" by William DeVaughn (written by DeVaughn).
"Fuck tha Police" samples "The Boogie Back" by Roy Ayers Ubiquity (written by Harry Whitaker).
"Express Yourself" samples "Express Yourself" by Charles Wright & the Watts 103rd Street Rhythm Band (written by Wright).
"The Nigga Ya Love to Hate" samples "Atomic Dog" by George Clinton (written by Clinton, Garry Shider, and David Spradley).
"No Vaseline" samples "Dazz" by Brick (written by Regi Hargis, Eddie Irons, and Ray "Ransom" Raymond).
"Nuthin' but a 'G' Thang" samples "I Want'a Do Something Freaky to You" by Leon Haywood (written by Haywood) and "Uphill (Peace of Mind)" by Kid Dynamite (written by Frederick Knight).

Charts

Weekly charts

Year-end charts

See also
 List of Billboard number-one R&B/hip-hop albums of 2016

References 

2016 soundtrack albums
G-funk soundtracks
Gangsta rap soundtracks
West Coast hip hop soundtracks
Universal Music Enterprises compilation albums
Albums produced by Dr. Dre
Albums produced by DJ Yella
Albums produced by Roy Ayers
Albums produced by George Clinton (funk musician)
Biographical film soundtracks
Drama film soundtracks